The 15201 / 02 Intercity Express is an Express  train belonging to Indian Railways East Central Railway zone that runs between  and  in India.

Coaches
The 15201 / 02 Intercity Express has 12 general unreserved & four SLR (seating with luggage rake) coaches . It does not carry a pantry car coach.

As is customary with most train services in India, coach composition may be amended at the discretion of Indian Railways depending on demand.

Service

Routing

Traction
As the route is going to electrification, a  based WDM-3A diesel locomotive pulls the train to its destination.

References

External links
15201 Intercity Express at India Rail Info
15202 Intercity Express at India Rail Info

Intercity Express (Indian Railways) trains
Transport in Patna
Rail transport in Bihar
Transport in Raxaul